Alexander Foster may refer to:

Alexander Foster (rugby union) (1890–1972), Irish rugby union player
Alexander Foster House

See also
Alex Foster (disambiguation)

Alexander Foster - British Association Footballer